Zenga  is a term for the practice and art of Zen Buddhist painting and calligraphy in the Japanese tea ceremony and also the martial arts. 

Zenga is a style of Chinese and Japanese calligraphy and painting, done in ink. The term is most often used for artwork by Buddhist monks, often without formal artistic training, and is sometimes contrasted with "nanga," or "literati painting," made by scholars.

In many instances, both calligraphy and image will be in the same piece. The calligraphy denotes a poem, or saying, that teaches some element of the true path of Zen. These inscriptions are usually short, often written in kana. The brush painting is characteristically simple, bold and abstract, and the style often playful and spontaneous.

In keeping with individual paths to enlightenment, nearly any subject matter can lend (and has lent) itself to zenga. Everything from a cat, to a bamboo shoot, to a man defecating in a field has been used to illustrate a particular point - although enso, sticks and Mount Fuji are the most common elements.

History
Though Zen Buddhism had arrived in Japan at the end of the 12th-century, Zenga flourished during the beginning of the Edo period in 1600, in the Kyoto area. The prelate of the Daitoku-ji temple, Takuan Sōhō, was a well-known Zenga painter; other notable practitioners during the Edo period included Hakuin Ekaku and Sengai Gibon.

The term "Zenga" was used at least as far back as Japanese scholar Okamoto Kanoko's studies of Ekaku, but with the renewed interest in Zen after World War II came a wave of further scholarship, both in Japan and in the West. Japanese-born Swiss scholar Kurt Brasch's books Hakuin and Zenga (1957) and Zenga (1962), as well as a traveling Zenga exhibition he organized in Europe from 1959 to 1960, were particularly influential. Brasch's use of the term "Zenga," however, prompted criticism from some Japanese scholars including Takeuchi Naoji, who argued that it narrowly categorized the art.

See also 
Chinese ink and brush painting
Japanese tea ceremony
Japanese calligraphy
Hitsuzendō
Bokuseki

References

Zenga
Chadō
Zen